Sydnee Andrews (born 12 December 2002) is a New Zealand judoka. She won a bronze medal at the 2022 Commonwealth Games, in  Women's Judo +78 kg.

Biography 
Andrews was born and raised in Gisborne, New Zealand and started judo at the age of 5. In 2022 she won a bronze medal at the Prague Open, and placed fifth at the Tunis Open. Andrews has been selected to represent New Zealand at the 2022 Commonwealth Games.

Andrews moved to the United Kingdom, and is based at the Camberly Judo Club.

References

External links
 

2002 births
Living people
Sportspeople from Gisborne, New Zealand
New Zealand female judoka
Commonwealth Games competitors for New Zealand
21st-century New Zealand women